Prophet is the sixth studio album, and the tenth album overall, by Swedish hard rock band Jerusalem. It was released simultaneously by Viva Records in Europe, R.E.X. Records in North America, and X ZERO Corporation in Japan.

Track listing
All music by Jerusalem, lyrics by Ulf Christiansson.
 "City on Fire"
 "Risen"
 "The Waiting Zone"
 "Umbrella"
 "Be There With You"
 "On the Road"
 "Likes Them"
 "Truth"
 "Face in the Crowd"
 "Tomorrow"
 "Berlin 38 (Next Year in Jerusalem)"
 "Soldier"

Singles
 "Tomorrow"b/w non-album track, "Coming Down"
 "The Waiting Zone" (radio edit)b/w "Berlin 38 (Next Year in Jerusalem)"

Personnel
 Ulf Christiansson - lead vocals, guitar
 Peter Carlsohn - bass guitar, background vocals
 Reidar I Paulsen - keyboards, background vocals
 Mikael Ulvsgärd - drums, background vocals

References

1994 albums